Yellow Medicine County is a county in the State of Minnesota. Its eastern border is formed by the Minnesota River. As of the 2020 census, the population was 9,528. Its county seat is Granite Falls.

The Upper Sioux Indian Reservation, related to the historical Yellow Medicine Agency that was located here, is entirely within the county. It was established under the Treaty of Traverse des Sioux in 1851, by which the Dakota ceded much territory in the region to the United States.

History

The county was established by the Minnesota legislature on March 6, 1871, with Granite Falls as the county seat. Its name comes from Yellow Medicine River, which runs through the eastern part of the county to the Minnesota. The river's name derives from a plant whose yellow root the native Dakota people used for medicinal purposes.

It was proposed in 1878 to create a new county, taken from the western portions of Yellow Medicine, Lincoln, and Lac qui Parle counties. The state legislature approved the petition (subject to local voter approval), and Governor Pillsbury signed the act on February 27, 1879. However, the 1879 ballot proposal failed to garner a combined majority of voters in the three counties, and the proposed Canby County did not come into being.

Geography
Yellow Medicine County lies on the west side of Minnesota. Its west border abuts the east border of the state of South Dakota. The Minnesota River flows east-southeasterly along the county's northeast side on its way to discharge into the Mississippi River. The Yellow Medicine River flows northeastward through the eastern part of the county, discharging into the Minnesota near the midpoint of the county's eastern border. The Stony Run Creek flows eastward through the upper east part of the county; the Florida Creek flows northeastward through the west end of the county, and the Lac qui Parle River also flows northeastward through the west central part of the county. The county terrain consists of rolling hills, carved by drainages. The area is devoted to agriculture. The terrain slopes to the east and slightly to the north; its highest point is on the west border, near its SW corner, at 1,732' (528m) ASL.

Lakes

 Burton Lake
 Culver Lake (part)
 Curtis Lake
 Highbank Lake
 Kvistid Lake
 Lake Louie
 Lone Tree Lake
 Miedd Lake
 Miller Lake
 Mud Lake
 Spellman Lake
 Timm Lake
 Tyson Lake
 Wood Lake

Rivers and drainages

 Florida Creek
 Lac qui Parle River
 Minnesota River
 Spring Creek
 Stony Run Creek
 Yellow Medicine River

Major highways

  U.S. Highway 59
  U.S. Highway 75
  U.S. Highway 212
  Minnesota State Highway 23
  Minnesota State Highway 67
  Minnesota State Highway 68
  Minnesota State Highway 274

Adjacent counties

 Lac qui Parle County - north
 Chippewa County - northeast
 Renville County - east
 Redwood County - southeast
 Lyon County - south
 Lincoln County - southwest
 Deuel County, South Dakota - west

Protected areas

 Bigrock State Wildlife Management Area
 Christopherson State Wildlife Management Area
 Clawson State Wildlife Management Area
 Flinks State Wildlife Management Area
 Miller-Richter State Wildlife Management Area
 Mound Springs Prairie Scientific and Natural Area
 Omro State Wildlife Management Area
 Oshkosh State Wildlife Management Area
 Penthole State Wildlife Management Area
 Posen State Wildlife Management Area
 Saint Leo State Wildlife Management Area
 Sioux Nation State Wildlife Management Area
 Stokke State Wildlife Management Area
 Stony Run State Wildlife Management Area
 Swedes Forest Scientific and Natural Area (part)
 Upper Sioux Agency State Park

Demographics

2000 census
As of the 2000 census, there were 11,080 people, 4,439 households, and 2,974 families in the county. The population density was 14.6/sqmi (5.64/km2). There were 4,873 housing units at an average density of 6.42/sqmi (2.48/km2). The racial makeup of the county was 96.09% White, 0.11% Black or African American, 2.04% Native American, 0.17% Asian, 0.01% Pacific Islander, 0.92% from other races, and 0.66% from two or more races. 1.76% of the population were Hispanic or Latino of any race. 36.5% were of Norwegian and 34.6% German ancestry.

There were 4,439 households, out of which 30.30% had children under the age of 18 living with them, 58.60% were married couples living together, 5.70% had a female householder with no husband present, and 33.00% were non-families. 29.30% of all households were made up of individuals, and 15.20% had someone living alone who was 65 years of age or older. The average household size was 2.42 and the average family size was 3.01.

The county population contained 25.80% under the age of 18, 7.40% from 18 to 24, 24.20% from 25 to 44, 22.20% from 45 to 64, and 20.50% who were 65 years of age or older. The median age was 40 years. For every 100 females there were 98.20 males. For every 100 females age 18 and over, there were 94.90 males.

The median income for a household in the county was $34,393, and the median income for a family was $42,002. Males had a median income of $27,770 versus $20,870 for females. The per capita income for the county was $17,120. About 7.10% of families and 10.40% of the population were below the poverty line, including 10.40% of those under age 18 and 10.60% of those age 65 or over.

2020 Census

Communities

Cities

 Canby
 Clarkfield
 Echo
 Granite Falls (county seat; partly in Chippewa County
 Hanley Falls
 Hazel Run
 Porter
 St. Leo
 Wood Lake

Unincorporated communities

 Burr (original name Stanley)
 Lorne
 Normania
 Spring Creek

Townships

 Burton Township
 Echo Township
 Florida Township
 Fortier Township
 Friendship Township
 Hammer Township
 Hazel Run Township
 Lisbon Township
 Minnesota Falls Township
 Norman Township
 Normania Township
 Omro Township
 Oshkosh Township
 Posen Township
 Sandnes Township
 Sioux Agency Township
 Stony Run Township
 Swede Prairie Township
 Tyro Township
 Wergeland Township
 Wood Lake Township

Government and Politics
Yellow Medicine County has recently been a swing county in national elections. Since 1980, the county has selected the Republican Party candidate in 56% of national elections (as of 2020). The county gave a majority to Barack Obama in 2008, but has trended more Republican in recent cycles.

See also
 National Register of Historic Places listings in Yellow Medicine County, Minnesota

References

External links

 Yellow Medicine County. GovOffice.com
 Yellow Medicine County. RootsWeb.com
 Yellow Medicine County Quick Facts. U.S. Census Bureau 

 
Minnesota counties
1871 establishments in Minnesota
Populated places established in 1871